Palaeodytes is a genus of beetles in the family Dytiscidae, containing the following species:

 Palaeodytes gutta Ponomarenko, 1987
 Palaeodytes incompleta Ponomarenko, Coram & Jarzembowski, 2005
 Palaeodytes sibiricus Ponomarenko, 1987

References

Dytiscidae